Janković is a Serbo-Croatian surname, a patronymic derived from Janko. It is found in Serbia, Croatia, Bosnia and Herzegovina and Montenegro. It may refer to:

Aleksandar Janković (born 1972), Serbian football coach
Alojzije Janković (born 1983), Croatian chess player
Boban Janković (1963–2006), Serbian basketball player
Boško Janković (born 1984), Serbian footballer
Božidar Janković (1849–1920), Serbian general and fieldmarshal, active during the First Balkan War
Božo Janković (1951–1993), Sarajevo-born Serbian footballer
Filip Janković
Janko Janković, Croatian retired footballer
Jelena Janković (born 1985), Serbian tennis player
Joseph Jankovic, American neurologist
Jovana Janković (born 1981), Serbian TV presenter, currently with RTS
Kenjo Janković (1797-1861), Montenegrin warrior and military leader
Ljubinka Janković (born 1958), Serbian handball player
Marko Janković (disambiguation), several people
Mihailo Janković (1911–1976), Serbian architect
Miki Janković (born 1994), Serbian tennis coach and former tennis player
Milan Janković, birth name of Serbian entrepreneur Philip Zepter
Milan Janković (footballer born 1959), retired Serbian footballer, formerly with Red Star Belgrade and Real Madrid
Mimi Mercedez, Milena Janković
Nataša Janković (born 1991), Croatian female handball player
Nenad Janković (born 1962), birth name of Serbian musician and TV personality Nele Karajlić
Radivoje Janković (1889–1949), Adjutant general of King Peter II of Yugoslavia whom he accompanied into exile.
Siniša Janković (born 1978), Serbian footballer
Slobodan Janković (footballer born 1946), retired Serbian footballer, formerly with Red Star Belgrade
Slobodan Janković (footballer born 1981), Serbian footballer
Stefan Janković (disambiguation), multiple people
Stojan Janković (1636–1687), Serbian military commander in Venetian service
Stole Janković (1925–1987), Serbian film director
Svetlana Velmar-Janković (born 1933), Serbian writer
Vladeta Janković (born 1940), politician, diplomat, former chief foreign policy adviser to Serbian Prime Minister Vojislav Koštunica
Vladimir Velmar-Janković (1895–1976), Serbian writer and politician
Vladimir Janković (born 1990), Greek basketball player of Serbian ethnicity, also known as Vlantimir Giankovits
Zoran Janković, several people
Ines Janković, Serbian fashion designer
Savo Janković, Montenegrin Football Player

See also 
 Yankovic
 Jankovich (disambiguation)
 6589 Jankovich, a minor planet
 Jankovic–Rivera syndrome, a neurodegenerative disease
 , a village in the Cetinje Municipality, Montenegro

Serbian surnames
Croatian surnames
Montenegrin surnames
Patronymic surnames
Surnames from given names